Elinor M. Brent-Dyer (6 April 1894 – 20 September 1969) was an English writer of children's literature who wrote more than one hundred books during her lifetime, the most famous being the Chalet School series.

Early life and education
Brent-Dyer was born Gladys Eleanor May Dyer on 6 April 1894 in South Shields. She was the only daughter of Charles Morris Brent Dyer, a surveyor, and Eleanor Watson Rutherford. Her father left the family when she was three years old and her mother remarried in 1913. In 1912, her younger brother Henzell died of meningitis.

Brent-Dyer was educated privately at a small school in South Shields until 1912 and shortly afterward trained to teach at City of Leeds Training College. She taught a variety of subjects at both state and private schools and ran a Girl Guide group. In the 1920s, she briefly studied music under Edgar Bainton at the Newcastle Conservatoire.

Career
Brent-Dyer's first book, Gerry Goes to School, was published in 1922 and became the first of the La Rochelle series.

She was inspired to start the Chalet School series after holidaying in the Austrian Tyrol at Pertisau-am-Achensee. The first book in the series, The School at the Chalet, was published in 1923.

Although she was raised as an Anglican, she converted to Roman Catholicism in 1930.

In 1933, Brent-Dyer and her mother moved to Hereford, where Brent-Dyer was employed as a governess in Peterchurch. In 1938, she opened her own school, the Margaret Roper School, which closed in 1948. She then dedicated all of her time to writing.

Brent-Dyer's mother died in 1957. In 1964, her long-time friend Phyllis Matthewman persuaded her leave the unmanageably large Victorian villa at which she had previously run her school in order to live with Phyllis and her literary agent husband, Sydney. After first living together as tenants in half of a house called Albury Edge, at Redhill, Surrey, they bought a house together, Gryphons, also at Redhill, in 1965. Phyllis's aunt, who knew the Dyer family, had introduced them to one another in childhood. Sydney Matthewman served as Brent-Dyer's agent. Brent-Dyer died at Redhill in 1969 and her final book was published posthumously the same year.

Bibliography

Chalet School series

(in reading order)

The School at the Chalet
Jo of the Chalet School
The Princess of the Chalet School
The Head-Girl of the Chalet School
The Rivals of the Chalet School
Eustacia Goes to the Chalet School
The Chalet School and Jo
The Chalet Girls in Camp
The Exploits of the Chalet Girls
The Chalet School and the Lintons
The New House at the Chalet School
Jo Returns to the Chalet School
The New Chalet School
The Chalet School in Exile
The Chalet School Goes to It
Highland Twins at the Chalet School
Lavender Laughs in the Chalet School
Gay From China at the Chalet School
Jo to the Rescue
a Mystery at the Chalet School
b Tom Tackles the Chalet School
c The Chalet School and Rosalie
Three Go to the Chalet School
The Chalet School and the Island
Peggy of the Chalet School
Carola Storms the Chalet School
The Wrong Chalet School
Shocks for the Chalet School
The Chalet School in the Oberland
Bride Leads the Chalet School
Changes for the Chalet School
Joey Goes to the Oberland
The Chalet School and Barbara
The Chalet School Does it Again
A Chalet Girl from Kenya
Mary-Lou of the Chalet School
A Genius at the Chalet School
A Problem for the Chalet School
The New Mistress at the Chalet School
Excitements at the Chalet School
The Coming of Age of the Chalet School
The Chalet School and Richenda
Trials for the Chalet School
Theodora and the Chalet School
Joey and Co. in Tirol
Ruey Richardson – Chaletian
A Leader in the Chalet School
The Chalet School Wins the Trick
A Future Chalet School Girl
The Feud in the Chalet School
The Chalet School Triplets
The Chalet School Reunion
Jane and the Chalet School
Redheads at the Chalet School
Adrienne and the Chalet School
Summer Term at the Chalet School
Challenge for the Chalet School
Two Sams at the Chalet School
Althea Joins the Chalet School
Prefects of the Chalet School

La Rochelle series
Gerry Goes to School
A Head Girl's Difficulties
The Maids of La Rochelle
Seven Scamps
Heather Leaves School
Janie of La Rochelle
Janie Steps In

Chudleigh Hold series
A loosely connected series of adventure books

Chudleigh Hold
The Condor Crags Adventure
Top Secret
Fardingales
The Susannah Adventure

Other works

A Thrilling Term at Janeways
Caroline the Second
The School by the River (1930)
The New House-Mistress
Judy the Guide
The Feud in the Fifth Remove
Carnation of the Upper Fourth
They Both Liked Dogs
The School by the River
The Little Marie-Jose
Elizabeth the Gallant
The Little Missus
Lorna at Wynyards
Stepsisters for Lorna
Kennelmaid Nan
Nesta Steps Out
Beechy of the Harbour School
A Leader in Spite of Herself
The School at Skelton Hall
Trouble at Skelton Hall
Bess on Her Own in Canada
A Quintette in Queensland
Sharlie's Kenya Diary
Verena Visits New Zealand
Jean of Storms (novel for adults, originally published in the Shields Gazette in 1930)
The Lost Staircase
Monica Turns Up Trumps

References

External links
 

1894 births
1969 deaths
20th-century English novelists
20th-century English women writers
Converts to Roman Catholicism
English children's writers
English Roman Catholics
English women novelists
People from Hereford